The 1975 Dutch Open was a men's tennis tournament staged at 't Melkhuisje in Hilversum, Netherlands which was part of the Group B tier of the 1975 Grand Prix. The tournament was played on outdoor clay courts and was held from 20 July to 27 July 1975. It was the 19th edition of the tournament, and first-seeded Guillermo Vilas won his second consecutive singles title at the event.

Finals

Singles
 Guillermo Vilas defeated  Željko Franulović 6–4, 6–7, 6–2, 6–3
 It was Vilas' 2nd singles title of the year and the 10th of his career.

Doubles
 Wojciech Fibak /  Guillermo Vilas defeated  Željko Franulović /  John Lloyd 6–4, 6–3

References

External links
 ITF tournament edition details

Dutch Open (tennis)
Dutch Open (tennis)
Dutch Open
Dutch Open
Dutch Open (tennis), 1975